Scotussa is a genus of spur-throated grasshoppers in the family Acrididae. There are about seven described species in Scotussa, found in South America.

Species
These species belong to the genus Scotussa:
 Scotussa brachyptera Cigliano & Ronderos, 1994
 Scotussa cliens (Stål, 1861)
 Scotussa daguerrei Liebermann, 1947
 Scotussa delicatula Liebermann, 1947
 Scotussa impudica Giglio-Tos, 1894
 Scotussa lemniscata (Stål, 1861)
 Scotussa liebermanni Mesa & Zolessi, 1968

References

Further reading

External links

 

Acrididae